Länsi-Herttoniemi (Finnish), Västra Hertonäs (Swedish) is a southeastern neighbourhood of Helsinki, Finland. It is one of the subdivisions of the wider Herttoniemi suburb.

Herttoniemi